5F-PB-22 (5F-QUPIC or quinolin-8-yl 1-pentyfluoro-1H-indole-3-8-carboxylate) is a designer drug which acts as a cannabinoid agonist. The structure of 5F-PB-22 appears to have been designed with an understanding of structure–activity relationships within the indole class of cannabinoids.

Pharmacology
5F-PB-22 acts as a full agonist with a binding affinity of 0.468 nM at CB1 and 0.633 nM at CB2 cannabinoid receptors.

Legal status

As of October 2015 5F-PB-22 is a controlled substance in China.

In January 2014, 5F-PB-22 was designated as a Schedule I controlled substance in the United States after several deaths were associated with its use.

In the United Kingdom, 5F-PB-22 is now classified and controlled as a Class B drug, following the November 2016 amendment to the Misuse of Drugs Act 1971. Several other synthetic cannabinoids structurally related to JWH-018, like 5F-PB-22, were also classified in this amendment.

See also 
 AM-2201
 JWH-018
 QUCHIC
 QUPIC
 SDB-001
 SDB-005

References 

Cannabinoids
Designer drugs
Indoles
Organofluorides
Quinolines